Jimmy Moran (1935–2020) is a Scottish former footballer.

Jimmy Moran may also refer to:
Jimmy Moran (cyclist), winner of 1910 Six Days of Boston
Jimmy Moran, character in the 1937 film The 13th Man

See also
James Moran (disambiguation)